The Grewals are the popular family that appeared in the second series  of the UK Channel 4 series The Family.

References

Channel 4
British television characters